Rathasaatchi (English: Martyr) is a 2022 Indian Tamil-language action drama film directed by Rafiq Ismail and starring Kanna Ravi, Elango Kumaravel, and Harish Kumar. It was released on 9 December 2022 in Aha Tamil.

Cast
Kanna Ravi as Appu
Elango Kumaravel as Murugesan
Harish Kumar as Iqbal
Charles Vinoth as Narayana
Kalyan as Devasagayam
O. A. K. Sundar as Tamil Nadu Chief Minister

Production
The film, based on B. Jeyamohan's short story Kathaigal from the novel Venkadal, was shot in 2022.

Reception
The film was released on 9 December 2022 on the OTT platform, aha. A reviewer from Times of India noted "Rathasaatchi is definitely worth a watch for the story it tries to tell, but the makers could have concentrated a little more on its screenplay and conflicts to make it more interesting as a movie". A critic from Cinema Express wrote "despite sticking to the hero-rise-and-fall template, good writing choices and terrific performances keep us hooked". OTTPlay noted it was "an intense and hard-hitting drama about a rebellious leader backed by some terrific performances".

References

2022 films
2020s Tamil-language films
Films based on short fiction
Indian action drama films
Films shot in Ottapalam
Films shot in Palakkad